Kafsh Kanan (also Romanized as Kafsh Kanān and Kafshkanān; also known as Khowshāb, Khowsh Āb-e Talkh, Khvoshāb, Khvosh Āb-e Talkh, and Khvoshāb Talkh) is a village in Kafsh Kanan Rural District, in the Central District of Bahmai County, Kohgiluyeh and Boyer-Ahmad Province, Iran. At the 2006 census, its population was 340, in 67 families.

References 

Populated places in Bahmai County